The South Carolina State Bulldogs men's basketball team is the basketball team that represents South Carolina State University in Orangeburg, South Carolina, United States. The school's team currently competes in the Mid-Eastern Athletic Conference.

Postseason results

NCAA Division I tournament results
The Bulldogs have appeared in the NCAA Division I Tournament five times. Their combined record is 0–5.

NCAA Division II tournament results
The Bulldogs have appeared in the NCAA Division II Tournament five times. Their combined record is 3–7.

CIT results
The Bulldogs have appeared in one CollegeInsider.com Postseason Tournament in 2016. Their record is 0–1.

NAIA results
The Bulldogs have appeared in one NAIA Tournament (NAIA). Their NAIA record is 1–1.

References

External links